Ternovoy is a rural locality (a settlement) in Chilekovskoye Rural Settlement, Kotelnikovsky District, Volgograd Oblast, Russia. The population was 221 as of 2010. There are 4 streets.

Geography 
Ternovoy is located 53 km northeast of Kotelnikovo (the district's administrative centre) by road. Samokhino is the nearest rural locality.

References 

Rural localities in Kotelnikovsky District